Lucheng is a station and the eastern terminus of the Line 6 of the Beijing Subway. It is the easternmost station in the Beijing Subway.

History
The construction of this station began on September 20, 2012, and was completed in 2014.

Location
This station is located in the Lucheng town in Tongzhou District, Beijing, after which it is named. The east end of Lucheng station connects to Dongxiaoying depot.

Station Layout 
The station has an underground island platform.

Exits 
There are 3 exits, lettered A, B, and D. Exit B is accessible.

References

Beijing Subway stations in Tongzhou District
Railway stations in China opened in 2014